Streamline Express is a 1935 American comedy drama film directed by Leonard Fields, starring Victor Jory, Evelyn Venable and Esther Ralston, distributed by Mascot Pictures. The film is an adaptation of Twentieth Century, released the previous year, in which Ralph Forbes appears in a similar role.

Plot
Broadway star Patricia Wallace (Evelyn Venable) quits her Broadway show to run off with wealthy Fred Arnold (Ralph Forbes).  Her director Jimmy Hart (Victor Jory) follows them aboard a futuristic super-speed monorail, the  Streamline Express. In its non-stop trip from New York City to Los Angeles in 20 hours, the double-decker Express can reach speeds up to 160 miles per hour.  Meanwhile, also aboard is John Bradley (Clay Clement) and his mistress Elaine Vincent (Esther Ralston), but Bradley's wife Mary (Erin O'Brien-Moore) ends up on the train as well.

When Elaine gives her crooked pal Gilbert Landon (Sidney Blackmer) a diamond pendant given her by Bradley, in order to keep Landon quiet about her past, she pretends that the pendant was stolen, in hopes of hiding the truth from Bradley.  But Landon manages to throw suspicion on Jimmy Hart, who is masquerading as a steward.  It takes confessions by several people to resolve everyone's dilemmas.

Cast
Victor Jory as Jimmy Hart
Evelyn Venable as Patricia Wallace
Esther Ralston as Elaine Vincent
Erin O'Brien-Moore as Mary Bradley (character erroneously credited as "Mary Forbes")
Ralph Forbes as Fred Arnold
Sidney Blackmer as Gilbert Landon
Vince Barnett as Mr. Jones
Clay Clement as John Bradley (character erroneously credited as "John Forbes")
Bobby Watson as Gerald Wilson
Lee Moran as Larry Houston
Syd Saylor as Smith, a Steward
Libby Taylor as Fawn, Patricia's Maid
Edward Hearn as Mack, a Purser
Allan Cavan as Senior Conductor
Wade Boteler as Baggage Gateman
Harry Tyler as Steve
Tommy Bupp as Wilbur, a Boy with Dog
Morgan Brown as Bartender
Jack Raymond as Baggage Man #1
C. Montague Shaw as Physician
Lynton Brent as Radio Operator
John Ridgely as Second Steward
Theodore von Eltz

References

External links 

 

Review and stills at Bad Movie of the Week

1935 films
1930s mystery comedy-drama films
1930s romantic comedy-drama films
American mystery comedy-drama films
1930s English-language films
American black-and-white films
American romantic comedy-drama films
Mascot Pictures films
Films about adultery in the United States
Films set on trains
Films produced by Nat Levine
Films directed by Leonard Fields
1930s American films